Malamaddi is a residential area in the city of Dharwad, in the Indian state of Karnataka. It is located near the Dharwad city railway station. The area is mainly middle-class. It was developed for independent houses (bungalows) with a courtyard and kitchen garden. This type of layout led to friendship among dwellers and harmony, where people used to know not only neighbours, but the entire locality.

MaLa in Kannada means "place above normal level" and maddi  in Kannada means "a hillock", a small hill. The two words together refer to the location of Malamaddi on a small hill above the normal elevations in Dharwad. Religious institutions such as Rayara Mutt and Uttaradi Mutt are located there.

Malmaddi is home to K.E. Board Primary and High School, as well as two hospitals: Chirayu Multi-Specialty Hospital and Prashanth Hospital and one Homeopathy Clinic: Asian Homeocare

Educational centers
Hindi Prachar Sabha
Basel Mission English medium high school
Basel Mission girls high school
Rajiv Gandhi English medium high 
school
Rajiv Gandhi Vidyalaya (CBSE)
KEBoard's English medium primary school
KEBoard's Kannada & English medium school of State & CBSE
Government primary school no. 11
Smart school junior
KPSE High School 
K Rubdi English medium Nursery & Kindergarten school
Dr. Rudolf Steiner's Education and welfare society
Nidhivani college of Commerce

Health Care
The list of health care centers/hospitals located in Malmaddi is provided below
Asian Homeocare-Homeopathy Clinic

Tavergeri Nusring Home pvt Ltd
Amruth Nursing home
Chirayu Multi-speciality Hospital
District Government Ayurvedic Hospital (South Malmaddi near Saraswatpur)
Dr. R.V Deshpande Health Clinic
ESI Hospital (Near Toll Naka)

Temples and religious places
Vanavasi Ram Mandir
 Shri Hanuman Temple
 Sita Ram Mandir
 Ulavi Basaveshwara Mandir

References 

Cities and towns in Dharwad district
Neighborhoods in Dharwad